Waheed Ahmed (born 15 November 1985) is a Pakistani-born cricketer who plays for the United Arab Emirates national cricket team. He made his Twenty20 debut for the United Arab Emirates against the England Lions on 4 December 2015.

In March 2019, he was named in the United Arab Emirates' Twenty20 International (T20I) squad for their series against the United States, but he did not play. In July 2019, he was again named in the United Arab Emirates' T20I squad, this time for their series against the Netherlands. He made his T20I debut for the United Arab Emirates against the Netherlands on 5 August 2019.

In October 2019, he was added to the United Arab Emirates' squad for the 2019 ICC T20 World Cup Qualifier tournament in the UAE. In December 2019, he was named in the One Day International (ODI) squad for the 2019 United Arab Emirates Tri-Nation Series. He made his ODI debut for the UAE, against the United States on 8 December 2019.

In December 2020, he was one of ten cricketers to be awarded with a year-long full-time contract by the Emirates Cricket Board.

References

External links
 

1985 births
Living people
Emirati cricketers
Cricketers from Sahiwal
United Arab Emirates One Day International cricketers
United Arab Emirates Twenty20 International cricketers
Pakistani emigrants to the United Arab Emirates
Pakistani expatriate sportspeople in the United Arab Emirates